Joanna Guy (born August 4, 1991) is a former Miss Maryland titleholder and Miss America Competition 2013 Top 10 Finalist and Talent Award winner. 

A Cornell University graduate, (government major; music minor) from Swanton, Maryland, she earned an MBA from the Fuqua School of Business at Duke University.

References

External links

Miss America 2013 delegates
1991 births
Living people
Cornell University alumni
American beauty pageant winners
Miss America Preliminary Talent winners
People from Garrett County, Maryland
Fuqua School of Business alumni